Hurricane Charley was the first of four separate hurricanes to impact or strike Florida during 2004, along with Frances, Ivan and Jeanne, as well as one of the strongest hurricanes ever to strike the United States. It was the third named storm, the second hurricane, and the second major hurricane of the 2004 Atlantic hurricane season. Charley lasted from August 9 to 15, and at its peak intensity it attained  winds, making it a strong Category 4 hurricane on the Saffir–Simpson scale. It made landfall in Southwest Florida at maximum strength, making it the strongest hurricane to hit the United States since Hurricane Andrew struck Florida in 1992 and at the time the strongest hurricane to hit southwest Florida in recorded history until Hurricane Ian in 2022.

After moving slowly through the Caribbean, Charley crossed Cuba on Friday, August 13 as a Category 3 hurricane, causing heavy damage and four deaths. That same day, it crossed over the Dry Tortugas, just 22 hours after Tropical Storm Bonnie had struck northwestern Florida. It was the first time in history that two tropical cyclones struck the same state in a 24-hour period.
Charley then continued to produce severe damage as it made landfall on the peninsula in Punta Gorda. It continued to the north-northeast along the Peace River corridor, devastating Punta Gorda, Port Charlotte, Cleveland, Fort Ogden, Nocatee, Arcadia, Zolfo Springs, Sebring, and Wauchula. Zolfo Springs was isolated for nearly two days as masses of large trees, power poles, power lines, transformers, and debris filled the streets. The city of Winter Park, north of Orlando, also sustained considerable damage since its many old, large oak trees had not experienced high winds. Falling trees tore down power utilities and smashed cars, and their huge roots lifted underground water and sewer utilities. The storm slowed as it exited the state over Ormond Beach just north of Daytona Beach. The storm was ultimately absorbed by a front in the Atlantic Ocean shortly after sunrise on August 15, near southeastern Massachusetts.

Charley was initially expected to hit further north in Tampa, and caught many Floridians off-guard due to a sudden change in the storm's track as it approached the state. Along its path, Charley caused 10 deaths and $16.9 billion in damage to insured residential property, making it the second costliest hurricane in United States history at the time. Charley was a compact, fast-moving storm, which limited the scope and severity of the damage.

Meteorological history 

Charley began as a tropical wave that moved off the west coast of Africa on August 4. It moved quickly westward and steadily organized over the open Atlantic Ocean, with convection developing in curved bands. The wave continued to develop as it approached the Lesser Antilles, and became Tropical Depression Three on August 9 while 115 mi (185 km) south-southeast of Barbados, near the island of Grenada, however, the threat to Barbados was short-lived. Low upper-level wind shear and well-defined outflow contributed to further intensification, and the depression strengthened on August 10, despite being located in the eastern Caribbean, which is an area not particularly suited to tropical cyclogenesis. At this time, the National Hurricane Center in Miami designated the name "Charley".

A strong ridge of high pressure to the system's north forced Charley to change track quickly to the west-northwest. The storm was being steered around the periphery of the high pressure area, and as a result, Charley changed direction toward the northwest. The hurricane continued to strengthen as it turned to the northwest and rounded the southwest portion of the subtropical ridge, becoming a major hurricane—a storm classified as a Category 3 hurricane or higher—just before making landfall on southern Cuba.

After crossing Cuba near Menelao Mora, Hurricane Charley accelerated to the north-northeast, toward the southwest coast of Florida in response to the approach of an unseasonal mid-tropospheric trough. The strike occurred only 22 hours after Tropical Storm Bonnie made landfall on St. Vincent Island, marking the first time two tropical cyclones hit the same state within a 24-hour period. An hour later, the hurricane struck Punta Gorda as a  storm and then passed up through Port Charlotte and the Charlotte Harbor. However, the eye had shrunk before landfall, limiting the most powerful winds to an area within  of the center.

It cut a swath of destruction across Florida, also passing near Kissimmee. The hurricane reemerged into the Atlantic Ocean after crossing directly over New Smyrna Beach as a Category 1 hurricane, but restrengthened slightly over open waters. Charley then began interacting with an approaching frontal boundary, becoming a tropical storm over southeastern North Carolina. After moving back into the Atlantic Ocean near Virginia Beach on August 15, the storm became extratropical and became embedded in the frontal zone. The extratropical storm continued to move rapidly to the northeast, and was completely absorbed by the front shortly after sunrise on August 15, near southeastern Massachusetts.

Preparations 

On August 10, two days before the hurricane passed near the island, Jamaican officials issued a tropical storm warning, which was upgraded to a hurricane warning a day later. In Jamaica, the threat of the storm forced the country's two airports to close, and also forced two cruise ships to reroute. The Cayman Islands issued a hurricane warning on August 11, a day before the hurricane passed near the archipelago.

Cuban government officials issued a hurricane watch for the southern coastline on August 11, two days before the hurricane struck the island. This was upgraded to a hurricane warning on the 12th, 13 ½ hours before Charley made landfall. Because of the threat, the government issued a mandatory evacuation for 235,000 citizens and 159,000 animals in the area of the expected impact. An additional 3,800 residents were evacuated from offshore islands, while 47,000 in Havana were transported from old, unsafe buildings to safer areas. The people were transported to shelters provisioned with supplies. In addition, the power grid in southern Cuba was turned off to avoid accidents.

On August 11, Florida governor Jeb Bush issued a state of emergency declaration due to the impending threat Charley presented to the state while the storm was still located south of Jamaica. The National Hurricane Center issued hurricane warnings for the Florida Keys and from Cape Sable to the mouth of the Suwannee River a day prior to Charley's passage through the state, while tropical storm warnings were issued elsewhere throughout Florida. Because of the threat, 1.9 million people along the Florida west coast were urged to evacuate, including 380,000 residents in the Tampa Bay area, and 11,000 in the Florida Keys.  It was the largest evacuation order for Pinellas County history, and the largest evacuation request in Florida since Hurricane Floyd five years before. Many Floridians remained despite the evacuation order, as authorities estimated that up to a million people would not go to shelters; instead, these residents boarded up their homes and bought supplies to ride out the storm. However, about 1.42 million people evacuated their homes in Florida, and approximately 50,000 residents were placed in shelters throughout the state. Power companies mobilized workers to prepare for the expected widespread power outages. MacDill Air Force Base, home of U.S. Central Command (USCENTCOM) and the U.S. military center for the Iraq War, severely limited its staff on base, shifting most of its operations to its forward headquarters in Doha, Qatar. Similarly, Kennedy Space Center, which usually counts with 13,000 on-site personnel, reduced its staff to only 200 people in preparation for the hurricane, and secured all Space Shuttles by sealing them in their hangars. Many amusement parks in the Orlando area closed early, and Walt Disney World's Animal Kingdom remained closed. This was only the second time in history that a Disney park was closed due to a hurricane, with the other occurrence being after Hurricane Floyd. The approaching hurricane also forced several cruise ships to reroute their paths, and forced rail service between Miami and New York to shut down.

The rapid strengthening of Charley in the eastern Gulf of Mexico caught many by surprise. Around five hours before its Florida landfall, Charley was a strong Category 2 hurricane predicted to strengthen its strongest winds to  upon its landfall in the Tampa–Saint Petersburg area. About two hours before landfall, the National Hurricane Center issued a special advisory, notifying the public that Charley had become a  Category 4 hurricane, with a predicted landfall location in the Port Charlotte area. As a result of this change in forecast, numerous people in the Charlotte County area were unprepared for the hurricane, although the new track prediction was well within the previous forecast's margin of error. National Hurricane Center forecasting intern Robbie Berg publicly blamed the media for misleading residents into believing that a Tampa landfall was inevitable. He also stated that residents of Port Charlotte had ample warning, as a hurricane warning had been issued for the landfall area 23 hours before, and a hurricane watch had existed for 35 hours.

Several local meteorologists, however, did depart from the official predictions of a Tampa Bay landfall as early as the morning of August 13. Jim Farrell of WINK, Robert Van Winkle WBBH, Steve Jerve of WFLA in Tampa, Jim Reif of WZVN in Fort Myers, and Tom Terry of WFTV in Orlando all broke with their national news forecasts and stated at around 1500 UTC that Charley was going to turn early, striking around Charlotte Harbor and traveling over Orlando, as would prove to be the case.

Following the Florida landfall, Georgia Governor Sonny Perdue declared a state of emergency as a precaution against a  storm surge and price gouging. In South Carolina, Governor Mark Sanford declared a state of emergency as Charley approached its final landfall. Two coastal counties were forced to evacuate, with state troopers redirecting traffic further inland from Myrtle Beach. In all, 180,000 evacuated from the Grand Strand area.

Impact 

One death in Jamaica, four deaths in Cuba, and ten deaths in the United States were directly attributed to Charley. Numerous injuries were reported, as well as 25 indirect deaths in the U.S.

Property damage from Charley in the United States was estimated by the NHC to be $16 billion. At the time, this figure made Charley the second costliest hurricane in United States history, behind 1992's Hurricane Andrew's $27.3 billion.

Caribbean Sea 

In Jamaica, strong winds caused moderate damage to the agricultural sector, with crop and livestock damage totaling to $1.44 million. As the storm traveled along the southwest coast of Jamaica, it caused heavy wind and rain damage. Damage was heaviest in Saint Elizabeth Parish, where 100 people had to be housed in six shelters. Strong winds downed trees and power lines, causing power outages and blocking roads. Throughout the country, Charley caused $4.1 million in damage and one fatality. In spite of the close approach that Charley made on the Cayman Islands, the islands were mostly spared, and were subjected to little damage.

Operationally, forecasters estimated that Charley struck southern Cuba as a  Category 2 hurricane on the Saffir–Simpson scale. In post-hurricane-season analysis, Charley was determined to have struck southern Cuba as a  hurricane; the original estimate was revised based on a report of a  sustained wind measurement in Playa Baracoa, and meant that Charley was a major hurricane at landfall.

Strong wind gusts downed nearly 1,500 power lines and knocked over 28 large high tension wire towers at a power plant in Mariel. As a result, more than half of the electricity customers in Havana Province were left without power for 12 days after the storm, and all of Pinar del Río Province was without power for over 11 days. Blackouts continued in areas where power returned. The power outages resulted in lack of drinking water for numerous people, including no potable water in the city of Havana for four days. As a result, the Cuban government sent water tanks to satisfy the short term need. Similarly, there was a lack of gas for cooking for over a week. However, one Cuban government official stated that it could take up to two months for basic utilities to be returned to many isolated villages.

Near its landfall location, Charley destroyed 290 of the 300 houses in the village, while over 70,000 homes in Havana were either damaged or destroyed. Numerous hotels reported damage, potentially impacting the important tourism industry in the country. Agricultural damage was heavy, with the hurricane damaging more than 3,000 agricultural institutions. Citrus officials estimated a loss of 15,000 metric tons of grapefruit on the Isle of Youth, while strong winds ruined 66,000 metric tons of citrus trees in the Havana area. Charley also destroyed around 57,000 acres (230 km2) of fruit trees in the Havana area. Approximately 95% of the sugar cane, bean, and banana crops were affected in Cuban territory. In all, Charley was directly responsible for four deaths in Cuba, and was responsible for $923 million in property damage, primarily from agricultural losses.

Florida 

Hurricane Charley severely affected the state of Florida. There were nine direct fatalities, 20 indirect fatalities, and numerous injuries attributed to the storm. Property damage was estimated at $5.4 billion, and approximately $285 million in agricultural damage.

The winds toppled a few trees, power lines, and unreinforced signs. A boat, knocked loose by strong waves, struck a power transmission line, causing widespread power outages from Marathon to Key West. The surge, combined with incoming waves, caused extensive flooding in the park and damaged numerous docks. In spite of this, property damage was minimal in the area, totaling $160,000.

The decrease in the height of the surge was due to the hurricane's small size and its rapid intensification just prior to landfall. Furthermore, the storm surge, combined with the strong pressure gradient, produced a  inlet on North Captiva Island, known as Charley's Cut. Strong waves and storm surge caused severe beach erosion and dune damage at various locations. The storm severely damaged five houses, lightly damaged many others, and downed many trees on Gasparilla Island. At least half of the 300 homes on North Captiva Island were substantially damaged, including ten that were destroyed. On Captiva Island, the strong winds severely damaged most houses, as well as several recreational buildings.

The city of Arcadia in DeSoto County saw extreme damage, in spite of being relatively further inland. About 95% of the buildings in the downtown area saw some sort of damage. The only shelter in the town had its roof torn open by the wind, leaving 3,500 evacuees inside unprotected from the onslaught of the storm.

Hardee County saw property damage estimated at $750 million, along with six injuries, but no deaths were reported. Charley caused blackouts in the entire county, as well as damage to 3,600 homes and the destruction of 1,400. A radio tower near Sebring was toppled, along with numerous trees and power poles along the north and east side of Highlands County. Additionally, there were several reports of severely damaged homes in Polk County near Babson Park and Avon Park. In Lake Wales, Florida, a sand mine lake encroached into State Road 60 due to wave action and swallowed a car. Additionally, Lake Wales saw 23,000 buildings damaged, as well as the destruction of 739 structures. Seven deaths were reported in the county, one of them determined to be direct.

Throughout the rest of the islands in Sarasota, Charlotte, Lee, and Collier counties, strong winds from Hurricane Charley caused severe damage to hundreds of buildings and trees. Lee County also endured an  storm surge. These counties were exposed to Charley's eyewall, so they saw the most damage. Due to its small size, the area of most intense damage was located within a 10-mi (16-km) band centered on Charley's track, with additional heavy damage forming an outer band extending  to each side of the inner swath of damage.  In Charlotte County, 80% of buildings were damaged.

The hurricane dropped generally light rainfall across Florida, with the maximum amount of  occurring in Bud Slough in Manatee County, east of Myakka River State Park. Port Charlotte's Saint Joseph's Hospital had its roof blown away by Charley's strong winds. Due to the compact nature of the hurricane, the storm's radius of maximum sustained winds only extended a short distance from its center. In South Florida, Charley spawned several tornadoes, including a long-lived F2 that struck Clewiston, and five weak tornadoes near the point where the hurricane made landfall.

The most severe damage from Hurricane Charley occurred in Charlotte County. In Boca Grande, numerous houses sustained extensive roof damage, while thousands of trees and power lines were uprooted or snapped. In Port Charlotte and Punta Gorda, many buildings, RVs, and mobile homes were completely destroyed, while other buildings suffered roofing damage due to the powerful winds.

Charley devastated Southwest Florida, causing $14.6 billion in property damage on the peninsula of Florida alone. Many towns such as Punta Gorda and Port Charlotte were leveled by the hurricane. Trees were downed and trailer parks were obliterated as far as Ormond Beach.

Charley also caused considerable damage in the central and eastern parts of the state. Several possible tornadoes occurred, with severe thunderstorms during the duration of the storm. At Orlando International Airport, debris littered two runways and lashing winds tore the roofs off three terminals and shattered two giant glass panels in the main terminal. The winds also ripped the roof right off of Brookside Elementary in Winter Park, leaving damage to the school, as well as the school’s cafeteria. The storm caused 2 million customers to lose electricity in Florida. In some areas, power was not restored for weeks: 136,000 residents had no electricity a week after Charley's landfall, and 22,000 customers, primarily from cooperatives, were still waiting for their service to be restored on August 26. Citizens in Daytona Beach, New Smyrna Beach, and Port Orange in Southeastern Volusia County also dealt with storm surge from the St. Johns River and Halifax River, and Intracoastal Waterway as Charley passed over before re-emerging into the Atlantic Ocean. Power was out in these areas for up to 12 days after the storm in some locations.

Public schools in some counties in the path of the hurricane were scheduled to be closed for two weeks. In some areas this was necessary because the school buildings were damaged or destroyed: all 59 of Osceola County's schools were damaged, and one-third of Charlotte County's were destroyed by Charley's impact. DeSoto County schools saw $6 million in damage, while Orange County Public Schools saw $9 million in damage to their educational infrastructure.

Agricultural losses were heavy. In Florida, the second-largest producer of oranges in the world, damage to the citrus crop was estimated at $200 million, and caused a 50% increase in the price of grapefruit juice. Charley, along with the other storms that hit Florida during 2004, caused a total agricultural loss of $2.2 billion. Other crops, nurseries, buildings, and agricultural equipment also suffered.

Due to its track being directly over Interstate 4, Charley is sometimes referred to as the I-4 hurricane.

Rest of United States 

Charley produced moderate rainfall along its path, peaking at over 7 in (178 mm). Moderate winds knocked down numerous trees. Flash flooding occurred in Charleston County, causing drainage problems. Damage in South Carolina totaled to $20 million.

This produced minor beach erosion along the coastline. The hurricane spawned five weak tornadoes across the state, including an F1 tornado in Nags Head that damaged twenty structures. Charley destroyed 40 houses and damaged 2,231, 231 severely, including 221 damaged beach homes in Sunset Beach. Crop damage was also heavy in Brunswick County, with 50% of the tobacco crop lost and 30% of the corn and vegetable fields destroyed. Strong winds downed trees and power lines, leaving 65,000 without power. Damage in North Carolina totaled to $25 million.

Charley produced one tornado in Chesapeake and one in Virginia Beach. In Rhode Island, one man drowned in a rip current.

Aftermath 

President George W. Bush declared Florida a federal disaster area. He later reflected on the government response to Charley:

U.S. Health and Human Services Secretary Tommy Thompson released $11 million in additional aid and other assistance to Florida, with $10 million to be earmarked to Head Start facilities that need repair or new supplies, another $1 million was provided to the DeSoto Memorial Hospital in Arcadia and Osceola Regional Medical Center in Kissimmee, and $200,000 would be spent to provide services to senior citizens. Across Florida, 114 food service operations and eight comfort stations were set up. FEMA opened four disaster recovery centers.

Retirement 

Because of its effects in the United States, the name Charley was retired from the rotating lists of tropical cyclone names in the spring of 2005 by the World Meteorological Organization. As a result, the name will never again be used for an Atlantic hurricane. The name was replaced with Colin for the 2010 Atlantic hurricane season.

See also 

 List of Florida hurricanes (2000–present)
 List of retired Atlantic hurricane names
 List of Category 4 Atlantic hurricanes
 Hurricane Donna (1960) – Another Category 4 hurricane that crossed Florida from southwest to northeast
 Hurricane Irma (2017) – A Category 5 hurricane that also made landfall as a major hurricane on the southwest side of Florida
 Hurricane Ian (2022) – Another Category 4 hurricane that hit at the same location, but was much larger in size

References

External links 

 
 Hurricane Charley Advisory Archive
 NHC August Monthly Tropical Weather Summary—includes figures for damages and fatalities
 Lack of a standard places Charley's deaths in question
 Air Photos of Charley's Damage From FloridaDisaster.org
 Wildlife and Habitat Damage Assessment from Hurricane Charley: Recommendations for Recovery of the J. N. "Ding" Darling National Wildlife Refuge Complex

 
2004 Atlantic hurricane season
2004 in Cuba
2004 in Florida
2004 in Jamaica
2004 in North Carolina
2004 in South Carolina
2004 in the Cayman Islands
August 2004 events in North America
Category 4 Atlantic hurricanes
Charlotte County, Florida
Charley 2004
Charley 2004
Charley 2004
Charley 2004
Charley 2004
Charley 2004
Retired Atlantic hurricanes
Tropical cyclones in 2004